Corgee is a hamlet in Cornwall, England, United Kingdom. It is situated approximately two miles (3 km) south of Lanivet.

References

Hamlets in Cornwall